The Wolf W-11 Boredom Fighter is an American single-seat biplane designed by Donald Wolf of Huntington, New York.  The aircraft is supplied as plans for amateur construction.

Design and development
The Boredom Fighter is a single-seat biplane designed to resemble a First World War SPAD S.XIII and completed aircraft are often painted in markings from that war.

The aircraft is constructed of wood, has fixed conventional landing gear with a tailskid, and the recommended powerplant is the  Continental A65 piston engine.

Specifications

References

Notes

Bibliography

External links

1970s United States civil utility aircraft
Homebuilt aircraft
Biplanes
Single-engined tractor aircraft
Aircraft first flown in 1979